Pico da Neblina (Mist Peak) is the highest peak in Brazil,  above sea level, in the Serra da Neblina, part of the Serra do Imeri, a section of the Guiana Highlands on the Brazil-Venezuela border. As determined by a border survey expedition in 1962, its summit lies just within Brazilian territory, at a horizontal distance of only  from the Venezuelan border at Pico 31 de Março. It's a common misconception to refer to this mountain as the highest point in South America outside the Andes while ignoring the Sierra Nevada de Santa Marta in Colombia.

As the peak's name suggests, it is shrouded in dense clouds most of the time. It was first ascended in 1965 by members of a Brazilian Army expedition.

Location

Officially, Pico da Neblina is located in the municipality of Santa Isabel do Rio Negro, state of Amazonas.

The mountain is contained in the Brazilian Pico da Neblina National Park; its northern slopes are also protected in Venezuela's Serranía de la Neblina National Park. The twin parks, together with the neighbouring Parima Tapirapecó National Park (Venezuela), form a protected area complex of about 80,000 km², possibly the largest national park system in tropical rainforests in the world. Pico da Neblina is also located within the territory of the Yanomami people's reservation.

Common misconceptions

Pico da Neblina is often mentioned as being on the exact border between Brazil and Venezuela. This is true for its massif as a whole, but the main summit is wholly in Brazil, 687 metres from the actual border. It is also sometimes mentioned as being the highest point in South America outside of the Andes, but this is not correct either: the title belongs to Sierra Nevada de Santa Marta in Colombia, which is almost twice the height of Pico da Neblina and completely detached from the Andes. However, Pico da Neblina is indeed the highest point east of the Andes range, and therefore of a large portion of the continent. Neighbouring Pico 31 de Março, which is on the precise international border, is also the highest point in Venezuela outside of the Andes.

Elevation measurements

This was then officially recognised by the Brazilian Institute of Geography and Statistics (IBGE), the federal government's official geographic survey and census agency, which jointly organised the expedition.

There was no new expedition or field measurement at the time; the new value is simply a mathematical recalculation of the altitude, based on the previously obtained GPS field data, taking into account a newly available, more precise mapping of the Brazilian territory regarding the geoid (the imaginary surface based on the Earth's gravitational field that is the reference for altitudes). This explains why Pico da Neblina and Pico 31 de Março, which are next to each other, had both exactly the same altitude correction.

Geology and topography
The Neblina Massif is composed of a tilted block of sandstone overlying Precambrian metamorphic rocks. The peak is an impressive sharp rock pyramid or tooth, towering high (when the peak is visible) over the nearby lowlands on the Brazilian side, as the Imeri range quickly rises from only about 100 metres above sea level to about 2,000 metres at the base of the peak in just a few kilometres; from there the peak rises sharply.

The Venezuelan side of the massif is hillier and the altitude gradient to the northern plains is less abrupt, although deep chasms and high walls still exist. Neighbouring Pico 31 de Março can be considered a secondary summit of Pico da Neblina; it has a smoother, rounder shape and is sometimes difficult to be clearly distinguished from Pico da Neblina on photographs, depending on angle and distance. Due to Pico da Neblina's equatorial latitude, while it can be cold on top, sub-freezing temperatures and frost appear to be rare (no permanent measurements are undertaken), and there is no snow.

Discovery

There is little documentation available today on the peak's discovery, and virtually none of it is authoritative, even though Brazilians only discovered the mountain fairly recently, in the mid-20th century. This late discovery can be understood if one remembers how extremely remote, inaccessible and uninhabited that part of the Amazon region is even today, and that it could hardly be expected that such a high mountain (by Brazilian standards) could be found standing next to the vast, low-lying Amazon Basin, even though it was known that there were mountains in that area. Moreover, as its own name states, Pico da Neblina is clouded and hidden from view most of the time.

All this led to it only being discovered in the 1950s. The exact date and circumstances are obscure and not documented, but a popular story often heard in Brazil says that it was supposedly seen and reported by an airline pilot who overflew it at a luckily cloudless moment. However, the massif was known well before that on the Venezuelan side, where it was called Cerro Jimé. In 1954, eight years before the Pico da Neblina was successfully climbed, the area was visited from the north by an expedition led by botanist Bassett Maguire, who reached the northern summit plateau of the massif and observed the highest peak, then unnamed, estimating it to be between "8,000-9,000 feet". The whole massif was named Cerro de la Neblina, since Maguire and Reynolds considered at the time that the massif constituted a separate formation from the Imeri range to the southeast.

Soon after the expedition, the highest peak, although unclimbed, was named Pico Phelps in honour of eminent ornithologist William H. Phelps Jr. At that time, the peak was thought to lie entirely within Venezuelan territory. During the 1962 Brazilian expedition, it was determined that the highest summit lies entirely in Brazil. The Brazilian expedition renamed the summit peak to Pico da Neblina, causing some confusion with the name Cerro de la Neblina, which is used in Venezuela to refer to the whole massif. The subsidiary summit on the Venezuelan-Brazilian border was named Pico 31 de Março in Brazil, but it is now known as Pico Phelps in Venezuela.

In the 1950s, it was not yet clear whether Pico da Neblina was in Brazilian or Venezuelan territory, and its precise elevation was not yet known. Therefore, it was still widely held for many years after the peak's discovery that Brazil's highest mountain was Pico da Bandeira (2,891 m or 9,486 ft), between the southeastern states of Minas Gerais and Espírito Santo, in a much more populated, developed and easily accessible region. Only in 1965 it was found and became widely known that Pico da Neblina was the country's highest mountain. Pico da Bandeira remains the highest Brazilian mountain outside of the Amazon region, and the third-highest overall, after Pico da Neblina and 31 de Março.

Access

Due to its location in a national park in a border area that is also part of Yanomami territory, access to the area is restricted and depends on a special permit by the Chico Mendes Institute for Biodiversity Conservation (ICMBio), the Brazilian government organisation responsible for national parks. The permit can be obtained at ICMBio's office in São Gabriel da Cachoeira, but all climbers must take an accredited local guide. A four-day trek each way should be expected, three of which consisting of a jungle trek in the rainforest that can be as hard and challenging as the climb itself. Rescue is close to impossible in the area.

Onchocerciasis or "river blindness," a parasitic disease that can cause permanent blindness and is transmitted by a black fly, is endemic in the area, albeit with a low incidence; malaria and yellow fever transmission are also possible. Therefore, climbers are advised not only to take the utmost precaution in avoiding insect bites but also to discuss preventive and/or therapeutic strategies with qualified physicians who are familiar with tropical diseases.

While the panners' presence there is technically illegal, they are widely tolerated by Brazilian authorities, and Czaban speculates that this would be because in such a remote area, they are believed to watch the border and nature better than the park rangers and the army would have the means to do. Czaban reports them to be very friendly and helpful.

See also

 Pico 31 de Março
 Pico da Neblina National Park
 Guiana Highlands

References

 Maguire, Bassett and Reynolds, Charles D. (1955) "Cerro de la Neblina, Amazonas, Venezuela: A Newly discovered Sandstone Mountain" Geographical Review 45(1): pp. 27–51
 Instituto Brasileiro de Desenvolvimento Florestal (1979) Plano do Sistema de Unidades de Conservação do Brasil. Ministério da Agricultura (MA), Instituto Brasileiro de Desenvolvimento Florestal (IBDF) and Fundação Brasileira para a Conservação da Natureza (FBCN), Brasília, D.F., OCLC 6944034. In Portuguese, covers the geology, geomorphology, climate, soils, vegetation and fauna of Pico da Neblina National Park.
 Gentry, A.H. (1986) "Exploring the Mountain of the Mists" Science Year: The World Book Science Annual pp. 124–139 it is a big mountain

External links
 Picasa gallery of photographs from two Brazilian private expeditions to Pico da Neblina, maintained by the Brazilian Mundo Vertical mountaineering site
 Robson Czaban's 1998 climb of Pico da Neblina - very detailed report (in Portuguese) of his visit to the peak, which originated some the pictures linked above, with its own picture album
 João Paulo Barbosa's 1999 expedition - another very detailed account (in Portuguese)

Mountains of Brazil
Mountains of Venezuela
Highest points of Brazilian states
Landforms of Amazonas (Brazilian state)
Highest points of countries
Extreme points of Brazil